6IX RISING: Toronto’s Rap Ascendence (pronounced six rising) is a Canadian documentary film about the hip hop culture in Canada. The film was directed by Shawney Cohen and released on November 16, 2017. It was distributed by Vice Media's online channel Noisey and made in collaboration with Nicolas Girard and Rafael Ruiz for Worship Studio.

Background
The documentary showcases the rising hip hop scene of Toronto, after the blockbuster success of Drake and The Weeknd. The film analyses the attention on how the success of these artists has turned the city's local rap scene into a hyper-competitive, and creative environment where young artists are competing for attention on the world stage. Artists and repertoire manager Lucas Prince, was involved with connecting the documentary makers with artists from Toronto to participate in the film. It was listed at number 3 in Now's Top Five Black Films to watch in 2018.

The film was premiered to a limited audience at Hot Docs Ted Rogers Cinema on the day of release. It also had a limited screening at the Maria A. Shchuka Library on February 9, 2018 and at the Toronto Reference Library on February 28, 2018, which were both presented by Noisey. All photo animations for the film were done by Nicolas Girard and Rafael Ruiz for Worship Studio. Some topics in the documentary include; Pressa's postponed rise due to legal issues, Friyie getting a lucky break from Floyd Mayweather Jr. & how Jimmy Prime reflects on coining the term '6ix' for Toronto. It was noted for providing an in-depth look into the Toronto's diverse and competitive hip hop culture scene.

Cast
 All artist appear as their respective stage name.

Big Lean
Castro Guapo (CMDWN)
Fiji (CMDWN)
Friyie
Pressa
Jazz Cartier
Jimmy Prime
Jay Whiss
Sick PPL
Andre Bryam
Sunny Diamonds
Keith Bell
Dukey Dukez
Drake
Roy Woods1
Floyd Mayweather Jr.1

Notes
1 Non-speaking appearance

References

External links

2017 films
Documentary films about the media
Documentary films about hip hop music and musicians
Canadian documentary films
2017 documentary films
Canadian hip hop films
Documentary films about Black Canadians
2010s English-language films
2010s Canadian films